Mycoplasma haemomuris, formerly known as Haemobartonella muris and Bartonella muris, is a Gram-negative bacillus.  It is known to cause anemia in rats and mice.

References

Further reading

haemomuris